Shawn D. Domagal-Goldman is a research space scientist at NASA Goddard Space Flight Center, who specializes in exoplanets, Archean geochemistry, planetary atmospheres, and astrobiology.

Education and career
Domagal-Goldman has a master's degree in Earth Sciences from the University of Rochester and a PhD in Geosciences and Astrobiology from the Pennsylvania State University.

Domagal-Goldman helped organize FameLab events in the US. He also talks about NASA science in public forums, such as AwesomeCon.

He is a recipient of the 2019 Presidential Early Career Award for Scientists and Engineers.

Research
For his research into "the early Earth and other terrestrial planets, he works on utilizing isotopic trends as proxies for atmospheric processes and elemental cycling", which "includes work on the fundamental controls on iron isotope fractionation and on global controls on mass-independent Sulfur isotope fractionation (S-MIF)". For extrasolar planets, he works on "spectroscopy-based characterization techniques" that inform scientists about "a planet’s surface climate, habitability, and ecosystems".

His research experience includes:

July 2007–present, Atmospheric Modeler, NASA Astrobiology Institute · Virtual Planetary Laboratory
July 2010–July 2012, NASA Astrobiology Management Postdoctoral Fellow, Oak Ridge Associated Universities, NASA Headquarters
July 2008–July 2010, Research Associate, University of Washington Seattle · Department of Astronomy
Research Associate at Penn State

Personal life
Domagal-Goldman has a daughter, her name is Maya.

Bibliography

Would Contact With Extraterrestrials Benefit or Harm Humanity? A Scenario Analysis
ABIOTIC OZONE AND OXYGEN IN ATMOSPHERES SIMILAR TO PREBIOTIC EARTH

Kopparapu, R. K., R. Ramirez, J. F. Kasting, et al.  2012. "Habitable Zones Around Main-sequence Stars: New Estimates." The Astrophysical Journal 765 131.

Domagal-Goldman, S. D., and V. S. Meadows. 2010. "Abiotic Buildup of Ozone." Pathways Towards Habitable Planets 1–6

References

External links
 How NASA is answering the question: Are we alone? | Shawn Domagal-Goldman | TEDxMidAtlantic

Living people
University of Rochester alumni
American scientists
Year of birth missing (living people)
Recipients of the Presidential Early Career Award for Scientists and Engineers